The 1956 United States Senate election in Nevada was held on November 6, 1956. Incumbent Democratic U.S. Senator Alan Bible, who won a special election to complete the unexpired term of Pat McCarran, was re-elected to a full term in office over Republican U.S. Representative Cliff Young.

General election

Candidates
Alan Bible, incumbent U.S. Senator since 1954 (Democratic)
Cliff Young, U.S. Representative at-large (Republican)

Results

See also 
 1956 United States Senate elections

References

Nevada
1956
United States Senate